Victoria Sancho Lobis (born 1976) is an American art historian and curator. She is the director of the Benton Museum of Art at Pomona College in Claremont, California.

Early life
Lobis was born in 1976 as Victoria Ana-Teresa Sancho, and grew up in Kansas City, Missouri. Her mother emigrated from Costa Rica and her father's family is from Puerto Rico. She attended Yale University, and then earned master's degrees from Williams College and Columbia University and a doctorate in art history from Columbia.

Career
Lobis was a curator at the University of San Diego. She then moved to the Art Institute of Chicago, before returning to Southern California to become the Sarah Rempel and Herbert S. Rempel Director of the Benton Museum of Art at Pomona College and an associate professor of art history at the college.

Personal life
Lobis is married and has a daughter. She lives in Claremont, California.

References

External links
Biography page at Pomona College

1976 births
Living people
American art historians
Women art historians
American curators
American women curators
Pomona College faculty
University of San Diego faculty
Yale University alumni
Williams College alumni
Columbia University alumni
People from Kansas City, Missouri
Historians from California
21st-century American women